The Newport 33 is an American sailboat, that was designed by Gary Mull and first built in 1971.

The Newport 33 is a development of the Newport 30.

Production
The boat was built by Capital Yachts in the United States from 1971 to 1996. The design is out of production.

Design
The Newport 33 is a small recreational keelboat, built predominantly of fiberglass, with wood trim. It has a masthead sloop rig, an internally-mounted spade-type rudder and a fixed fin keel.

Variants
Newport 33
The boat has a PHRF racing average handicap of 159 with a high of 159 and low of 159.
Newport 33 SD
The boat has a PHRF racing average handicap of 174 with a high of 174 and low of 183.
Newport 33 PH
The boat has a PHRF racing average handicap of 159 with a high of 150 and low of 168.

See also
List of sailing boat types

References

Keelboats
1970s sailboat type designs
Sailing yachts
Sailboat type designs by Gary Mull
Sailboat types built by Capital Yachts